The Panzhou railway station is a railway station of the Shanghai–Kunming high-speed railway located in Panzhou, Guizhou.

Railway stations in Guizhou
Railway stations in China opened in 2016